Ron's Gone Wrong (Original Motion Picture Soundtrack) is the soundtrack album to the 2021 computer-animated film Ron's Gone Wrong. It was released digitally on October 15, 2021 by Hollywood Records and Walt Disney Records, followed by a physical edition being published on October 22, the same day as the film's theatrical release. The soundtrack album featured music composed by Henry Jackman, along with an original song titled "Sunshine" sung by Liam Payne, which was released as a part of the soundtrack on September 24.

Development 
Henry Jackman composed the film score. Speaking about the score, Jackman said that "it has its own identity, similar to Wreck-It Ralph or Big Hero 6" having the "same musical landscape and color in this film", and also had enjoyed working in the film, calling the scoring sessions as "enormous fun". Jean-Philippe Vine and Sarah Smith, the directors of the film, expressed gratitude to Jackman on how his score, elevated the film. In an interview to The Illuminerdi, he stated about how the music become important, especially for an animation film as they need to "give a sensational moment for audience to experience it in theatres". Smith had said that "working with Henry was the biggest blast ever. He's absolutely nuts and completely brilliant. And, I think we pushed him and pushed him, constantly kind of raising the bar for what we wanted with thematics and emotion and so on. And it's like he gives your movie back to you. And I know he's really proud of the score, and I'm really proud that he's really proud because I think he did some of his best work." Smith wanted the score to have a "contemporary John Hughes feel to it" while also asking him for "a classic 'high school movie' vibe and the orchestral scale and emotion of E.T. on top".

The score was recorded at Abbey Road Studios and Air Studios in London, England. Jackman composed most of the tracks, with two songs in collaboration with Dave Bayley of the indie-pop band Glass Animals. Liam Payne was reported to be composing and performing an original song in June 2021, On August 27, 2021, he released a music video for the film's soundtrack titled "Sunshine". Payne said that he wrote the song to impress his son Bear Payne, and he really "enjoyed working on the track".

Track listing

Release 
The soundtrack was released on October 15, 2021 through digital formats by Hollywood Records and Walt Disney Records, making this the first 20th Century Studios animated feature film to have the film's soundtrack album released through the two musical record labels. It also had a physical release on October 22, the same day as the film's theatrical release and also a vinyl edition is scheduled for release later. A single titled "Sunshine" performed by Liam Payne, was earlier released as a music video format on August 27, 2021, for promotional purposes. The video featured silhouettes from the film, and a vocal performance by Payne. It was released as an official audio format on September 24, by Capitol Records.

Critical reception 
Nathan Diaz of Post Credit wrote "The score from Henry Jackman is electrifying. It blends traditional classical music with EDM and rock beats. This mixture leads to the soundtrack that captures the essence seamlessly." SLUG Magazine-based Patrick Gibbs wrote "The first rate musical score by Jackman, expertly moves between comically bouncy, rousingly adventurous and quietly touching, and it’s one of the year’s best." In a more critical review for the film, Associated Press based Mark Kennedy criticised the original song "Sunshine" by Liam Payne as a "pale imitation of Maroon 5's song".

Personnel 
Credits adapted from Tidal.

Technical 
 Composer: Henry Jackman
 Additional music composers: Alex Kovacs, Anthony Willis, Halli Cauthery
 Additional arrangements: Maverick Dugger
 Music editors:  Christoph Bauschinger, Paul John Chandler, Jack Dolman
 Score editor: John Traunwieser
 Score conductor: Matt Dunkley
 Score engineer: Chris Fogel, Nick Wollage
 Technical engineer: Felipe Pacheco
 Music mixing: Alan Meyerson
 Assistant mixing: Colby Donaldson
 Music executive: Patrick Houlihan
 Music preparation: Jill Streater, Dan Boardman
 Music consultant: Michelle De Vries
 Music production services: Matthew K. Justmann
 Music clearance: Ellen Ginsburg

Musicians 
 Viola: Richard Cookson, Daniel Bhattacharya
 Violin: Marianne Haynes, Tom Pigott Smith
 Cello: Masoud Sepahi, Tanjeeb Khan
 Piano: Jackey Mishra
 Double bass: Laurence Ungless, Patrick Savage, Roger Linley

Orchestra 
 Orchestra: Isobel Griffiths Ltd.
 Orchestra contractor: Jenny Nendick
 Conductor: Everton Nelson
 Lead orchestrator: Stephen Coleman
 Sub-orchestrators: Andrew Kinney, Edward Trybek, Henri Wilkinson, Michael J. Lloyd
 Assistant orchestators: Benjamin Hoff, Jamie Thierman, Jonathan Beard, Sean Barrett

References 

2021 soundtrack albums
Film scores
Hollywood Records soundtracks
Walt Disney Records soundtracks
Henry Jackman soundtracks
Animated film soundtracks
Albums recorded at AIR Studios